
Yong'an is a county-level city in Fujian, China.

Yongan may also refer to:

Locations
Yong'an District, in Kaohsiung, Taiwan
Yong'an Temple, a Buddhist temple in Yunlin, Taiwan
Yongan Market Station, a Taipei Metro station in Taipei, Taiwan
Yong'an Brook, the upper stretch of the Jiao River, Zhejiang, China
Historical name or Mengshan County, Guangxi, China

Subdistricts in People's Republic of China
Yong'an Subdistrict, Jiamusi, in Qianjin District, Jiamusi, Heilongjiang
Yong'an, Wuhan, in Caidian District, Wuhan, Hubei
Yong'an, Xianning, in Xian'an District, Xianning, Hubei
Yong'an, Xuzhou, in Quanshan District, Xuzhou, Jiangsu
Yong'an, Zibo, in Zhoucun District, Zibo, Shandong

Towns in People's Republic of China
Yong'an, Anhui, in Suzhou, Anhui
Yong'an, Dianjiang County, in Dianjiang County, Chongqing
Yong'an, Fengjie County, in Fengjie County, Chongqing
Yong'an, Guangdong, in Zhaoqing, Guangdong
Yong'an, Guangxi, in Bobai County, Guangxi
Yong'an, Fenggang County, in Fenggang County, Guizhou
Yong'an, Xishui County, Guizhou, in Xishui County, Guizhou
Yong'an, Jidong County, in Jidong County, Heilongjiang
Yong'an, Suihua, in Suihua, Heilongjiang
Yong'an, Liuyang, in Liuyang, Changsha, Hunan
Yong'an, Inner Mongolia, in Tuquan County, Inner Mongolia
Yong'an, Dashiqiao, in Dashiqiao, Liaoning
Yong'an, Dongying, in Dongying, Shandong
Yong'an, Hunyuan County, in Hunyuan County, Shanxi
Yong'an, Fenxi County, in Fenxi County, Shanxi
Yong'an, Chengdu, in Chengdu, Sichuan
Yong'an, Zigong, in Zigong, Sichuan
Yong'an, Zhongjiang County, in Zhongjiang County, Sichuan
Yong'an, Beichuan County, in Beichuan Qiang Autonomous County, Sichuan
Yong'an, Neijiang, in Neijiang, Sichuan
Yong'an, Nanchong, in Nanchong, Sichuan
Yong'an, Tongjiang County, in Tongjiang County, Sichuan

Townships in People's Republic of China
Yong'an Township, Yongfu County, in Yongfu County, Guangxi
Yong'an Township, Du'an County, in Du'an Yao Autonomous County, Guangxi
Yong'an Township, Guizhou, in Songtao Miao Autonomous County, Guizhou
Yong'an Township, Heilongjiang, in Jixian County, Heilongjiang
Yong'an Township, Jiangxi, in Jiujiang, Jiangxi
Yong'an Township, Jilin, in Nong'an County, Jilin
Yong'an Township, Shandong, in Zaozhuang, Shandong
Yong'an Township, Sichuan, in Puge County, Sichuan
Yong'an Township, Zhejiang, in Rui'an, Zhejiang

Historical eras
Yong'an (258–264), era name used by Sun Xiu, emperor of Eastern Wu
Yong'an (304), era name used by Emperor Hui of Jin
Yong'an (401–412), era name used by Juqu Mengxun, king of Northern Liang
Yong'an (528–530), era name used by Emperor Xiaozhuang of Northern Wei
Yong'an (1098–1100), era name used by Emperor Chongzong of Western Xia

See also
Yong'an dialect of Central Min (also known as Min Zhong)
Wing On, a Hong Kong department store, also operated in Shanghai
Wing On House, a building in Central, Hong Kong
Wing On Bank, a defunct Hong Kong bank